Haddatha is a village in Bint Jbeil District in Southern Lebanon.

History
In 1596, it was named as a village, ‘“Hadata” in the Ottoman nahiya (subdistrict) of Tibnin under the liwa' (district) of Safad, with a population of 52 households, all Muslim. The villagers paid a fixed tax-rate of 25% on agricultural products, such as wheat, barley, fruit trees, goats and beehives, in addition to "occasional revenues”; a total of 4,640 akçe.

In 1838, Edward Robinson noted the village on his travels in the region.

In 1875, Victor Guérin found the population to be exclusively Metualis.
In 1881, the PEF's Survey of Western Palestine (SWP) described Haddatha: "A village, built of stone, containing about 150 Metawileh, on hill-top; a few grapes, figs and olives, and arable cultivation; there is a spring near and cisterns in village; a birket for cattle."

Following the 1982 invasion, Haddatha became part of the Israeli security zone. On 24 February 1989, an Irish soldier was shot dead by members of the Israeli backed SLA. At the time there were 600 Irish soldiers serving with UNIFIL.

During the 2006 Lebanon War, Israel shelled a house with 6 civilians, killing all of them. They were aged from 50 to 80 years old.

People from Haddatha 
Husayn Muruwwa

References

Bibliography

External links
Survey of Western Palestine, Map 4: IAA, Wikimedia commons
Haddatha, Localiban

Populated places in the Israeli security zone 1985–2000
Populated places in Bint Jbeil District
Shia Muslim communities in Lebanon